Year 1532 (MDXXXII) was a leap year starting on Monday (link will display the full calendar) of the Julian calendar.

Events 

 January–June 
 January 22 – São Vicente is established as the first permanent Portuguese settlement in Brazil.
 March 18 – The English Parliament bans payment by the English Church to Rome.
 April – Battle of Quipaipan in Peru: Atahualpa wins the civil war in the Inca Empire, defeating his brother Huáscar.
 May 13 – Francisco Pizarro lands on the northern coast of Peru.
 May 16 – Sir Thomas More resigns as Lord Chancellor of England. 
 June 25 – Suleiman the Magnificent leads another invasion of Hungary.

 July–December 
 July 23 – The Nuremberg Religious Peace is granted to members of the Schmalkaldic League, granting them religious liberty.
 August 13 – Union of Brittany and France: The Duchy of Brittany is absorbed into the Kingdom of France.
 August 5–30 – Siege of Güns: The Ottoman army under Sultan Suleiman the Magnificent fails to take the city of Güns, and due to the incoming raining weather and reinforcements from Charles V to Vienna, Suleiman's army retreats.
 September 1 – Anne Boleyn is created Marquess of Pembroke by her fiancé, King Henry VIII of England.
 November 16 – Francisco Pizarro and his men capture Inca emperor Atahualpa at Cajamarca, ambushing and slaughtering a large number of his followers, without loss to themselves. He subsequently offers a ransom of approximately $100 million in gold.

 Date unknown 
 The Prince is published, five years after the death of the author, Niccolò Machiavelli.
 Pantagruel is published by François Rabelais.
 Henry VIII of England grants the Thorne brothers a Royal Charter to found Bristol Grammar School.
 Stamford School is founded in England by William Radcliffe.
 The Paris Parlement has the city's beggars arrested "to force them to work in the sewers, chained together in pairs".
 A possible date for the battle of the Maule between Incas and Mapuches, according to historian Osvaldo Silva.

Births 

 January 21 – Ludwig Helmbold, German classical singer (d. 1598)
 February 14 – Richard Lowther, English soldier and official (d. 1607)
 February 19 – Jean-Antoine de Baïf, French poet and member of the Pléiade (d. 1589)
 March 20 – Juan de Ribera, Spanish Catholic archbishop (d. 1611)
 March 25 – Pietro Pontio, Italian music theorist and composer (d. 1596)
 April 13 – Frederick of Denmark, Prince-bishop (d. 1556)
 April 21 – Martin Schalling the Younger, German theologian (d. 1608)
 April 23 – Anna Marie of Brunswick-Lüneburg, Duchess of Prussia (d. 1568)
 April 24 – Thomas Lucy, English politician (d. 1600)
 June 6 – Giulio Antonio Santorio, Italian Catholic cardinal (d. 1602)
 June 7 – Amy Robsart, wife of Robert Dudley, 1st Earl of Leicester (d. 1560)
 June 13 – Countess Palatine Helena of Simmern, countess consort of Hanau-Münzenberg (1551-1561) (d. 1579)
 June 16 – Francis Coster, Brabantian Jesuit theologian, author (d. 1619)
 June 24 
 Robert Dudley, 1st Earl of Leicester, English politician (probable; d. 1588)
 William IV, Landgrave of Hesse-Kassel, German Protestant leader (d. 1592)
 July 1 – Marino Grimani, Doge of Venice (d. 1605)
 July 12 – Mechthild of Bavaria, German duchess (d. 1565)
 July 25 – Alphonsus Rodriguez, Spanish Jesuit lay brother and saint (d. 1617)
 August 14 – Archduchess Magdalena of Austria, Member of the House of Habsburg (d. 1590)
 October 4 – Francisco de Toledo, Spanish Catholic cardinal (d. 1596)
 October 30 – Yuri of Uglich, Prince of Uglich (d. 1563)
 November 16 – Clara of Brunswick-Wolfenbüttel, Abbess of Gandersheim, later Duchess of Brunswick-Grubenhagen (d. 1595)
 November 22 – Anne of Denmark, Electress of Saxony (d. 1585)
 November 28 – Bartholomäus Ringwaldt, German poet and theologian (d. 1599)
 December 7 – Louis I, Count of Sayn-Wittgenstein (d. 1605)
 December 20 
 John Günther I, Count of Schwarzburg-Sondershausen (d. 1586)
 Orazio Samacchini, Italian painter (d. 1577)
 December 26 – Guilielmus Xylander, German classical scholar (d. 1576)
 date unknown
 Robert Abercromby, Scottish Jesuit missionary (d. 1613)
 William Allen, English cardinal (d. 1594)
 Hernando Franco, Spanish composer (d. 1585)
 Luís Fróis, Portuguese missionary (d. 1597)
 Pedro Sarmiento de Gamboa, Spanish explorer (d. 1592)
 John Hawkins, English navigator (d. 1595)
 Étienne Jodelle, French dramatist and poet (d. 1573)
 Ralph Lane, English explorer (d. 1603)
 Henry Percy, 8th Earl of Northumberland (d. 1585)
 Thomas Norton, English lawyer (d. 1584)
 Tulsidas, medieval Hindi poet and philosopher (d. 1623)
 Flavio Orsini, Italian Catholic cardinal (d. 1581)
 probable
 Sofonisba Anguissola, Italian portrait painter (d. 1625)
 Archibald Campbell, 5th Earl of Argyll, Scottish politician (d. 1575)
 Orlande de Lassus, Flemish composer (d. 1594)

Deaths 

 May – Elizabeth Stafford, Countess of Sussex
 June – Bernardino Luini, Italian painter (b. 1482)
 June 28 – Pompeo Colonna, Italian Roman Catholic cardinal (b. 1479)
 August 11 – John of Denmark, Danish prince (b. 1518)
 August 16 – John, Elector of Saxony (b. 1468)
 August 19 – Caritas Pirckheimer, German nun (b. 1467)
 August 22 – William Warham, Archbishop of Canterbury (b. 1450)
 September – Vlad VI Înecatul, Prince of Wallachia
 October 1 – Jan Mabuse, Flemish painter
 December 2 – Louis Gonzaga (Rodomonte), Italian-French dignitary and diplomat (b. 1500)
 December 3 – Louis II, Count Palatine of Zweibrücken, Duke of Zweibrücken from 1514 to 1532 (b. 1502)
 December 11 – Pietro Accolti, Italian Catholic cardinal (b. 1455)
 December 13 – Solomon Molcho, Portuguese mystic (b. 1500)
 December 30 – Krzysztof Szydłowiecki, Polish noble (b. 1467)
 date unknown
 Andrea Riccio, Italian sculptor and architect (b. 1470)
 Jeanne de la Font, French poet and culture patron (b. 1500)
 Huáscar, 12th Inca Emperor

References